A barbican (from ) is a fortified outpost or fortified gateway, such as at an outer defense perimeter of a city or castle, or any tower situated over a gate or bridge which was used for defensive purposes.

Europe
In the Middle Ages, barbicans were typically situated outside, or at the edge of, the main line of defenses, and were connected to the city walls with a walled road called the neck.  They would thus defend the entrance to the city or castle at the "choke point". In the 15th century, with the improvement in siege tactics and artillery, barbicans lost their significance. Barbicans were built well into the 16th century. Fortified or mock-fortified gatehouses remained a feature of ambitious French and English residences well into the 17th century. Portuguese medieval fortification nomenclature uses barbican to describe any wall outside of and lower than the main defensive wall that forms a second barrier.  The barrier may be complete, extensive or only protect particularly weak areas.  The more restrictive term gate barbican is used for structures protecting gates.

Arab world
The origin of the English word barbican is thought to be found in either Persian or Arabic (see here or here).

Paul Deschamps (1888–1974) interpreted the Arabic word 'bashura[h]' as used in 13th-century chronicles to mean barbican, a defensive structure placed ahead of a gate, but this has been debunked, 'bashura' denoting rather an entire section of the outer fortifications, which may include a barbican, but also a bastion, gate, tower, or all of those together.

South Asia
Barbicans were also used in South Asian fortifications where some of their purposes were to protect the main gate from being rammed by war elephants.

East Asia
Fortifications in East Asia also feature similar high structures. In particular, gates in Chinese city walls were often defended by an additional "archery tower" in front of the main gatehouse, with the two towers connected by walls extending out from the main fortification. Literally called "jar walls", they are often referred to as "barbicans" in English.

See also
 Gatehouse
 Kraków Barbican
 Warsaw Barbican
 Saint Laurence Gate, Drogheda
 Wall of Vilnius

References

External links

 
 
 Barbican at Location Textures
 Barbican, A Fortified Outpost Of Old Town Of Krakow, Poland on DreamSite
 Parts of Medieval Castles
 Krakow Barbican – The Last Remains of the City’s Medieval Defences  on Absolute Tours
 Barbican on Encyclopædia Britannica
 Castle Barbican on Medieval Chronicles
 Barbican on Ancient Fortresses

Barbicans